The following is a list of FCC-licensed radio stations in the U.S. state of Minnesota, which can be sorted by their call signs, frequencies, cities of license, licensees, and programming formats.

List of radio stations

Defunct
 Beat Radio
 KBJI-LP
 KDXL
 KFMX
 KFNK
 KLBB
 KMAP
 KPNP
 KQEP-LP
 KQRB
 KSJU
 WCAL
 WEEP

References

 
Minnesota
Radio